Carga de rurales is an 1896 Mexican short black-and-white silent documentary film directed by Gabriel Veyre.

See also 
 List of Mexican films of the 1890s

External links 
 
 
 

1896 films
Mexican black-and-white films
1890s short documentary films
Mexican silent short films
Mexican short documentary films
Black-and-white documentary films